The South Australian Railways B class was a class of  steam locomotives operated by the South Australian Railways.

History
In 1856 the South Australian Railways ordered two  tender locomotives from Robert Stephenson and Company, the first arriving in November 1856 and the second in March 1858. They entered service on the Gawler and Outer Harbor lines. In 1875 both were rebuilt as  tank engines. In 1887, number 7 was rebuilt by Islington Railway Workshops as a crane locomotive with number 4 following in 1893. Both were withdrawn and scrapped in the 1930s.

Class list

References

Railway locomotives introduced in 1856
Robert Stephenson and Company locomotives
B
2-4-0 locomotives
2-4-0T locomotives
Broad gauge locomotives in Australia
Scrapped locomotives 
Passenger locomotives